"R.I.P. (Millie)" is a song by Australian rock-pop band Noiseworks. It was released in September 1991 as the fourth single from their third studio album Love Versus Money (1991) and peaked at number 26 on the ARIA singles chart.
The song is dedicated to Jon Stevens' mother who died of cancer. Stevens later reflected saying, "Over the years I’ve had so many people tell me how much "R.I.P (Millie)" has helped them deal with their own loss in their lives. To be able to impact on peoples lives in such a positive way is incredibly inspiring."

Track listing
CD single (657371 5)

CD maxi (657371 2)

Charts

External links
 https://www.discogs.com/Noiseworks-RIP-Millie/master/251764

References

Noiseworks songs
1991 songs
1991 singles
Australian pop rock songs
Columbia Records singles
Songs written by Steve Balbi
Songs written by Justin Stanley
Songs written by Jon Stevens